The Air Navigation (Restriction of Flying) (Wimbledon) Regulations 2014 is a statutory instrument of the Parliament of the United Kingdom. The order restricted aviation activities around Wimbledon during the Wimbledon Tennis Championships using the powers conferred on the Secretary of State for Transport by the Air Navigation Order 2009.

Provisions
The provisions of the order include:
Preventing aircraft from flying below 1500 feet within 0.75 nautical miles of the All England Lawn Tennis and Croquet Club, where the Wimbledon Championships are held, between 9 a.m. and 11p.m. from the 23 June 2014 until the 6 July 2014.

Exempting the Metropolitan Police Service, the Helicopter Emergency Medical Service, any aircraft landing at or departing from London Heathrow and any aircraft flying with the permission of the Championships Safety Officer from the ban.

See also

List of Statutory Instruments of the United Kingdom, 2014

References

Aviation in the United Kingdom
Law of the United Kingdom
2014 in British law
2014 Wimbledon Championships
Statutory Instruments of the United Kingdom